Vegesack is a northern district of Bremen, the capital of the German state Free Hanseatic City of Bremen (Freie Hansestadt Bremen).

Geography
Abutting the district of Vegesack to the northwest is the district of Blumenthal, in the southeast the district of Burglesum. Across the river Weser is the Lower Saxony village Lemwerder, connected to Vegesack by a ferry service.

History

Vegesack was established long before the 14th century. At that time the mouth of the river Lesum and the small brook Aue to the river Weser was a preferred and protected berth for sailing ships in the winter time or in the stormy seasons. Therefore, the first buildings might have been a few workshops and accommodations and pubs for the sailors. After the first mention of a ferry across the Weser in the 14th century, the name "Vegesack"  was first used in 1453. The source and the meaning of the name is unknown but might be derived from the pub "Thom Fegesacke".

In its long history Vegesack often changed hands. In 1648 it became Swedish, 1712 Danish, 1802 Bremish and 1810 French. In 1850 Vegesack received town privileges and in 1939 it became again part of the city of Bremen.

From 1619 to 1623 the first artificial harbour of Germany, and one of the first in Europe, was built in Vegesack. The reason for this was the growth of shallows in the river Weser, which blocked big sailing ships from reaching Bremen´s harbour. Goods were then transshipped in the Vegesack-harbour to smaller boats or horse-drawn vehicles and transported to Bremen. With the new harbour the importance of Vegesack increased rapidly.

The importance of Vegesack can be seen in the following:

In 1863 the forerunner of the German life boat service was founded in Bremen by Adolph Bermpohl, a navigation-teacher in Vegesack 

In 1893 a fishing company was founded which became, in the mid-1930s, Europe's biggest herring fleet; Vegesack was the port of registry of this company which was closed in the 1960s.

In 1805 the Lange shipyard was founded by Johann Lange. This company constructed in 1817 Germany´s first steaming ship Die Weser.

In the first half of the 19th century Vegesack was the home of the Lange and the Ulrich shipyards. Both were the predecessors of the Bremer Vulkan shipyard and the Janssen/Sager shipyard. With these three shipyards, Vegesack was the greatest and most important shipbuilding site on the Weser river for a long time.

In 1896 the  shipyard Bremer Vulkan was founded by some Bremen politicians and merchants. It became the greatest shipyard in civilian shipbuilding before World War I. The so-called Bremer Vulkan Verbund AG or Vulkan Group became Germany´s greatest shipbuilding company in the 1970s with altogether about 22,000 workers. The Vegesack shipyard closed in 1997.

The 1875 the Lürssen shipyard was founded and is one of the greatest German shipyards today. While the headquarters is located directly at the Vegesack harbour, the production facilities are located on the opposite side of the Weser in Lemwerder as well as in the former Vulkan area.

Culture and sights

Museums
Sail training ship Schulschiff Deutschland, called The White Swan of the Lower-Weser. It is a pure sailing ship without auxiliary engine and the last German full-rigged three-master  ship, today owned and operated by the German Training Ship Association, Bremen. Constructed in 1927 by the Joh. C. Tecklenborg shipyard in Geestemünde, which is now  part of the city of Bremerhaven, the ship was listed as a historical monument in 1994.

Schloß Schönebeck (Castle Schönebeck), built middle of 14th century by Johann von Oumunde (=Aumund), head of the Knights of Oumunde. Reconstructed in the 17th century, today it is used as a local museum for exhibitions and exclusive events.

Theatre
Since 1989, the Statt-Theater-Vegesack, a semi-professional troupe of actors, has performed both classical and self-composed plays. The performances take place in the Bürgerhaus Vegesack community centre.

Music
The event centre KITO, hosted in an old storehouse, offers jazz, blues, folk and classical concerts and political theatre.

Parks

Along the river Weser is the Stadtgarten (town garden) stretches along the Weserpromenade between the ferry and the Gläserne Werft (shipyard showcase). At the bottom of the scarp you can find many foreign trees and a rose garden, at the top are villas and captain's houses.

Regular events
The Vegesacker Hafenfest (Vegesack harbour festival) takes place on the first weekend in June. Three days full of live music, shanty choirs, maritime attractions and happy people.

The Festival Maritim (beginning of August) also offers a lot of international maritime live music, Kleinkunst, open-air cinema and "Kutterpullen", a rowing contest.

At the beginning of September, Vegesack celebrates the Vegesacker Markt (Vegesack market); a fair with fairground rides, raffle booths, shooting galleries and much more. In 2005 the fair was held for the 197th time. It starts with the pageant across the city, and ends with the wet funeral of the market-witch in the Weser.

Transportation
Vegesack is connected to the A 27 by the Autobahn 270.
A railway branch line, operated by NordWestBahn, links Vegesack to Bremen central station and Verden. Public transport is served by several bus lines of the Bremer Straßenbahn AG.
A car ferry connects Vegesack and Lemwerder.

Education and science
Jacobs University Bremen in Grohn.

Sons and daughters

 Heinrich Behmann (1891-1970), mathematician, professor in Halle (Saale).
 Friedrich Gerhard Rohlfs (1831-1896), African explorer and writer; After him the main shopping street and a school center (former Gerhard-Rohlfs-Gymnasium) is named in Vegesack. 
 Günther Schwarberg (1926-2008), journalist in Hamburg,  wrote the book  The SS Physician and the Children of the Bullenhuser Damm , a forgotten chapter from the "Endphaseverbrechen" (crimes at the end of the war) in Nazi Germany.
 Jürgen Trittin (born 1954), politician Alliance '90/The Greens), Federal Minister for the Environment, Nature Conservation and Nuclear Safety from 1998 to 2005, 
 August Wilmanns (1833-1917), old philologist and general manager of the Berlin State Library

Other personalities
The following personalities (alphabetically arranged) acted in Vegesack:

 Jan Böhmermann (born 1981 in Bremen), radio and television supporter and comedian.
 Leo Drabent (1899-1944) lived in Vegesack and organized the antifascist resistance in and around Bremen.
 Erich Lackner (1913-1992) German engineering scientist of Austrian origin.
 Walter Momper (born 1945), SPD politician, President of the House of Representatives of Berlin and former mayor of Berlin, grew up in Vegesack. 
 Bernd Neumann (born 1942 in Elbing), politician (CDU), state minister for culture and media in Berlin, graduated in Vegesack and worked as a teacher.
 Heinrich Oebker (1899-1975), teacher and headmaster, 
 Albrecht Wilhelm Roth (1757-1834), German physician and botanist 
 Carl Schuchhardt (1859-1943), prehistorian and director of the Neues Museum in Berlin. He grew up in Vegesack and went to school in 1872-1877.

References

 Sophie Hollanders: Vegesack – Alte Bilder einer Hafenstadt. Johann Heinrich Döll Verlag, Bremen 1984,  (Vegesack- Old Pictures of a Port-Town)

External links
Bremen.de
Vegesack.de, commercial portal

Vegesack
Neuengamme concentration camp
Culture in Bremen (city)